These are the official results of the Women's Heptathlon competition at the 1992 Summer Olympics in Barcelona, Spain. There were a total number of 32 participating athletes, with one non-starter and six competitors who didn't finish the competition.

Medalists

Records
These were the standing world and Olympic records (in points) prior to the 1992 Summer Olympics.

Final classification

See also
1990 Women's European Championship Heptathlon (Split)
1991 Women's World Championship Heptathlon (Tokyo)
1992 Hypo-Meeting
1993 Women's World Championship Heptathlon (Stuttgart)
1994 Women's European Championship Heptathlon (Helsinki)

References

External links
 Official Report
 Results

Heptathlon
1992
1992 in women's athletics
Women's events at the 1992 Summer Olympics